The 3rd Grand Prix de Sables d'Olonne was a Formula Two motor race held on 9 August 1953 at Les Sables-d'Olonne, in Pays de la Loire, France. The race was held over two heats of 45 laps each, with the result being decided by aggregate time. The overall winner was Louis Rosier in a Ferrari 500. Louis Chiron was second in an O.S.C.A. Tipo 20 and Stirling Moss third in a Cooper T24-Alta. Jean Behra and Maurice Trintignant were the winners of heat 1 and 2 respectively, both driving a Gordini Type 16, but both retired from the other heat.

Results

References

Sables
Sables
Sables